The Catwalk is a 1927 German silent drama film directed by Gerhard Lamprecht and starring Lissy Arna, Jack Trevor, and Andreas Behrens-Klausen. It was based on the 1890 novel of the same title by Hermann Sudermann. The film premiered at the Capital am Zoo in Berlin. Art direction was by Otto Moldenhauer.

Cast

References

Bibliography

External links
 

1928 films
1920s historical drama films
German historical drama films
Films of the Weimar Republic
German silent feature films
Films directed by Gerhard Lamprecht
Films based on German novels
Films based on works by Hermann Sudermann
Films set in Prussia
Napoleonic Wars films
National Film films
German black-and-white films
1928 drama films
Silent drama films
1920s German films